Candace Noemi Johnson (born 28 December 1993) is an American-born Panamanian footballer who plays for the Panama women's national football team as a defender.

She competed with Panama women's national football team for qualification to 2015 FIFA Women's World Cup.

Youth career
Candace Johnson played for University of Missouri in Southeastern Conference, during her college years.
In 2015, Johnson was named to First Team All-SEC.
During her junior year, she was named to Second Team All-SEC.
In 2013 during her sophomore year, she was named to 2013 Fall SEC Academic Honor Roll.
In her freshman year, she was named to SEC All-Freshman Team.

Chicago Red Stars
On January 15, 2016, Johnson was selected by the Chicago Red Stars with the 36th overall pick in the 2016 NWSL College Draft. She did not make the team's final roster and played the 2016 season with the Chicago Red Star Reserves in the Women's Premier Soccer League.

International
On May 22, 2014, Candace Johnson played in qualification for 2015 world cup for Panama against Belize women's national football team, and scored the first goal at the sixth minute, in a 13–1 drubbing of Belize.

Personal
Candace is the daughter of Dwane and Raquel Johnson and calls Dallas, Texas her hometown. She studied health science at University of Missouri. Candance attended Ursuline Academy of Dallas for high school education and played soccer for Jaime Cantrell.

See also
 List of Panama women's international footballers

References

1993 births
Living people
People with acquired Panamanian citizenship
Panamanian women's footballers
Women's association football defenders
Panama women's international footballers
Soccer players from Dallas
American women's soccer players
Missouri Tigers women's soccer players
Chicago Red Stars draft picks
American sportspeople of Panamanian descent
Women's Premier Soccer League players